Tramitichromis intermedius is a species of cichlid endemic to Lake Malawi where it is found in the southern parts of the lake preferring the shallows of sheltered bays.  It can reach a length of  TL.  It can also be found in the aquarium trade.

References

External links 
 Photograph

intermedius
Taxa named by Ethelwynn Trewavas
Fish described in 1935
Taxonomy articles created by Polbot